Vera Ramaciotti  (19 March 1891–1982) was an Australian philanthropist who with her brother, Clive Ramaciotti, established the Clive and Vera Ramaciotti Foundation.

Early life
Ramaciotti was the only daughter of Major General Gustave Ramaciotti CMG, the owner of the Theatre Royal in King Street, Sydney, Australia. She was born in Ashfield and attended Sydney Church of England Girls' Grammar School as a boarder. In 1911 she travelled abroad for the coronation of King George V.

Legacy
Clive Ramaciotti was interested in bio-medical research and Vera planned the establishment of the Clive and Vera Ramaciotti Foundation with him before his death in 1967. The Foundation was established with an investment of $6.7 million and is managed by Perpetual Trustees. The funds combined capital is in excess of $60 million. A Scientific Advisory Committee advises Perpetual on the grants to be awarded each year. In 1970, when the Foundation had accumulated interest of $600,000, initial payments were made to 27 institutions. Since its establishment the fund has allocated over $40 million to biomedical research supporting more than 3000 research programs. The Australian Women's Weekly published an article, in 1970, entitled "The Quiet Millionairess" that claimed Vera was "Australia's least-known millionairess" and "possibly the most private woman in Australia", adding that she "physically shrinks from seeing her name in print".

References

External links
 Perpetual Trustees
 The Clive & Vera Ramaciotti Centre for Gene Function 
 ANU Research Centre
 Vera Ramaciotti – Biography

1982 deaths
1891 births
Australian Commanders of the Order of the British Empire
Australian women philanthropists
Australian philanthropists
20th-century philanthropists
People educated at Sydney Church of England Girls Grammar School
20th-century women philanthropists